Benjamin Walker Scodelario-Davis (né Davis; born June 21, 1982) is an American actor and stand-up comedian. He starred as Andrew Jackson in the musical Bloody Bloody Andrew Jackson, which premiered on Broadway in 2010. He has appeared in a number of Broadway productions, notably as Patrick Bateman in the 2016 musical adaptation of the novel American Psycho and as Chris Keller in the 2019 revival of All My Sons, for which he was nominated for a Tony Award for Best Featured Actor. On screen, he is known for his title role in the 2012 film Abraham Lincoln: Vampire Hunter, as well as his appearances in the films Kinsey, Flags of Our Fathers, and In the Heart of the Sea. In 2019, he starred as Erik Gelden in the third and final season of Marvel's Jessica Jones from Netflix. He plays the High King of the Ñoldorin Elves Ereinion Gil-galad in the Amazon Prime Video series The Lord of the Rings: The Rings of Power.

Early life
Walker was born in Cartersville, Georgia, the younger of two boys born of Jeannine (née Walker), a music teacher, and Greg Davis, who owned a movie rental store and works in financial services. He took his mother's maiden name as his stage name because there was a Benjamin Davis already registered with the Screen Actors Guild. He attended Cartersville High School in Cartersville, the Interlochen Arts Academy near Traverse City, and the Juilliard School in New York City. He graduated from the Juilliard Actor Training Program in 2004.

Acting career

Stage
In February 2007, Walker portrayed Bertram Cates in the Broadway revival of Inherit the Wind. The production opened at the Lyceum Theatre on April 12 and enjoyed a 10-week run to a full house. The show was nominated for four Tony awards, including Best Revival. In April 2008, Walker appeared as the Chevalier Danceny in the Roundabout Theatre Company's production of Les Liaisons Dangereuses. He played the inexperienced lover who becomes the sex pawn of the pernicious La Marquise de Merteuil. Described as the "definitive battle of the sexes" by Broadway World, the production enjoyed a full house and was nominated for six Tony awards.

In December 2007, Walker starred as Andrew Jackson in the musical Bloody Bloody Andrew Jackson during its world premiere at the Center Theatre Group's Kirk Douglas Theatre in Los Angeles. In 2010, he reprised his role in the musical, first off-Broadway at the Public Theater and then at the Bernard B. Jacobs Theatre on Broadway. The musical enjoyed a successful, but short, run. It was also a critical hit, but was nominated for few awards. Walker starred in numerous incarnations of the show to great critical acclaim, including Bloody Bloody Andrew Jackson: The Concert Version (a four-week workshop run at Public Theater in March 2009), and the thrice-extended return at the Public Theater in March 2010.  The production closed on January 2, 2011.

From 2012 to 2013, Walker portrayed Brick in a revival of Cat on a Hot Tin Roof. His other stage credits include The Arrangements at the Atlantic Theatre Company (2005), the Lincoln Center Theater workshop of Spring Awakening (2005), Lady Windermere's Fan (2005), Romeo and Juliet (2006), and American Psycho (2016). He received a Tony Award for Best Featured Actor in a Play nomination for his performance in the 2019 Broadway revival of All My Sons.

Film

Walker starred in the short film All Saint's Day (2007), which was the Savannah College of Art and Design winner for the narrative short category. In 2009, he appeared in the independent films Coach and The War Boys. In 2010, Walker was cast as Hank McCoy/Beast in X-Men: First Class, but dropped out of the role to star in the Broadway musical Bloody Bloody Andrew Jackson. It was announced in January 2011 that Walker would star as Abraham Lincoln in the film adaptation of Abraham Lincoln, Vampire Hunter. The film was released in June 2012. Walker told Rolling Stone magazine that he read a number of biographies on Lincoln to prepare for the role. He was cast as Archangel Michael in the film adaptation of Paradise Lost, but production was cancelled in 2012. He starred as Kevin Connolly in the 2012 film Muhammad Ali's Greatest Fight.

Stand-up comedy career
Walker has performed stand-up comedy at Caroline's, Comedy Village, and The Comedy Store. His comedy show, Find the Funny, features comics and taped short narratives and skits, and is performed regularly in New York City.

Personal life
Walker became engaged to actress Mamie Gummer in 2009, and they were married in 2011. They lived in an apartment in Park Slope, Brooklyn. In March 2013, it was announced that they had amicably separated and planned to divorce.

Walker began dating his co-star, Kaya Scodelario, in April 2014. They became engaged on December 28, 2014. He and Scodelario married in late 2015 and both adopted the surname "Scodelario-Davis". The couple had a son in November 2016. In September 2021, the couple announced they were expecting their second child, a girl, who was born in December 2021.

Filmography

Film

Television

Theater credits

References

External links

 
 
 broadway.yahoo.com 
 Activities
 Production detail

1982 births
Living people
Male actors from Georgia (U.S. state)
American male film actors
American male stage actors
American male television actors
Juilliard School alumni
21st-century American male actors